Umberto Mottini is a Tahitian professional football manager.

Career
In 1996, he coached the Tahiti national football team. Since 1997 until 1998 he was a head coach of the Tonga national football team.

References

External links

Year of birth missing (living people)
Living people
French Polynesian football managers
Tahiti national football team managers
Expatriate football managers in Tonga
Tonga national football team managers
Place of birth missing (living people)
French Polynesian expatriate football managers
Tahitian expatriate sportspeople in Tonga